is

References

Year of birth missing (living people)
Living people
Indian women activists